Gomes is a common Portuguese and Old Galician surname. It derived from the given name Gomes, which derived from the Visigothic word guma, meaning "man". 

Its Spanish equivalent is Gómez.

Notable people

A–E
Al Gomes (born 1960), American music producer, music industry strategist, and songwriter
Albert Gomes (1911–1978), Trinidad and Tobago politician, labour leader and author
Albino Gomes (born 1994), Indian footballer 
Ana Gomes (born 1954), Portuguese politician
André Gomes (born 1993), Portuguese footballer
Angel Gomes (born 2000), English footballer
Antônio Carlos Gomes (1836–1896), Brazilian composer
António Gomes Leal (1848–1921), Portuguese poet
Anthony Gomes (born 1970), Canadian musician
Bruno Gomes (born 1996), Brazilian footballer
Chandima Gomes (born 1966), Sri Lankan Sinhala Malaysian engineer, physicist and writer
Chico (footballer, born 1988), full name Francisco Miguel Franco Antunes Gomes, Portuguese footballer
Chiquinho Baiano (born 1980), full name Francisco Gomes de Andrade Junior (born 1980), Brazilian footballer.
Diogo Gomes (c. 1420–1500), Portuguese navigator and explorer
Eduardo Gomes (1896–1981), Brazilian soldier and politician

F–M
Fernão Gomes (15th century), Portuguese explorer and merchant
Francis Anthony Gomes (1931–2011), Bangladeshi Roman Catholic bishop
Francisco Gomes da Rocha, (1745–1808), Brazilian composer 
Francisco Gomes de Amorim, (1827–1891), Portuguese poet and Dramatist
Francisco da Costa Gomes (1914–2001), Portuguese military officer and politician, the 15th President of the Portuguese Republic
Francisco Dias Gomes (1745–1795), Portuguese poet and literary critic 
Francisco Luís Gomes, (1829–1869), Indo-Portuguese physician, writer, historian, economist, politician
Ed Gomes (1936-2020), American politician
Gene Gomes (1946–2018), American judge
Gomes da Costa (footballer), (born 1919), former Portuguese footballer
Gomes de Sequeira (16th century),  Portuguese explorer
Gomes Eanes de Zurara (c. 1410–1474), Portuguese chronicler
Harold Gomes (born 1933), American boxer
Heurelho Gomes (born 1981), Brazilian footballer
Jessica Gomes (born 1984), Australian model
Jonny Gomes (born 1980), American baseball player
José Alencar Gomes da Silva (1931–2011), Brazilian politician
Larry Gomes (born 1953), Trinidadian cricketer
Manuel Teixeira Gomes (1860–1941), Portuguese politician and president of Portugal
Manuel Gomes da Costa (1863–1929), Portuguese army officer, politician and president of Portugal
Marcelo Gomes (dancer) (born 1979), Brazilian ballet dancer
Mário Centeno, full name Mário José Gomes de Freitas Centeno (born 1966), Portuguese economist and politician
Miguel Gomes (fencer) (born 1972), Portuguese fencer

N–Z
Nácia Gomes (1925–2011), Cape Verdean singer
Nádia Gomes (born 1996), Portuguese footballer
Nuno Gomes (born 1976), Portuguese footballer
Nuno Gomes (diver) (20th/21st century), Portuguese-born South African Scuba Diver
Peter J. Gomes (1942–2011), American clergyman
Pedro Gomes (triathlete) (born 1983), Portuguese triathlete
Ralph Gomes (1937–2020), Guyanese track and field athlete
Ryan Gomes (born 1982), American basketball player
Soeiro Pereira Gomes (1909–1949), Portuguese writer
Steve Anthony (born 1959 as Stephen Anthony Gomes), Canadian broadcaster
Sumana Gomes (born 1968), Sri Lankan cinema actress
Venceslau Brás Pereira Gomes (1868–1966), Brazilian politician and president of Brazil
Weasley Gomes de Olivera (born 1962), Brazilian footballer
Yan Gomes (born 1987), Brazilian American baseball player

Institutions 
Dr Francisco Luis Gomes District Library, the major library in the district of South Goa, Goa, India
Gomes Elementary School, a school in Fremont, California

Places 
Pedro Gomes, a municipality in Mato Grosso do Sul, Brazil

See also 
Gómez,  a common Spanish surname
Gomis, variant spelling

Portuguese-language surnames
Patronymic surnames